Paul Igag (February 24, 1964 – October 29, 2010) was a Papuan ornithologist.

Igag was born in Krangket village, Madang Province of Papua New Guinea. He was PNG's first national expert on birds, who held a PhD from Madang province. He was one of the first scientific staff at the young Research and Conservation Foundation of PNG, then he became one of the first scientific staff at the Wildlife Conservation Society PNG Programme, and later on became a founder of the Papua New Guinea Institute of Biological Research. He participated in a documentary film called Birds of the Gods which was directed and hosted by David Attenborough, and was released on November 18, 2010.

He died suddenly on October 29, 2010, at the age of 46, in Goroka after suffering pains in his chest. Igag's body was flown from Goroka to Madang on Saturday and came to Krangket village on Sunday where a service was held at 9am. His body was laid to rest at 2pm on Sunday. After the death, close friends and scientific colleagues have created an online memorial in his memory, which they hope will create a good profile of his life and a last record and tribute of all of his accomplishments.

References

1964 births
2010 deaths
People from Madang Province
Papua New Guinean ornithologists